"Controller" is a song by New Zealand band L.A.B., released as a single from their debut album L.A.B. in mid-2018. After the success of the band's song "In the Air" (2019), the song became a hit in New Zealand.

Composition

"Controller" was one of the first songs the band L.A.B. wrote, inspired by the story of a woman who falls blindly in love with a controlling man. The song incorporates 1980s-style pop synths and percussion.

Release

The song was released as a single in July 2018, alongside the release of the song's music video, directed by Shae Sterling. The song became a hit in 2020 after the release of the band's single "In the Air", becoming the 8th most successful single by a New Zealand artist in 2020.

Critical reception

Dave Tucker of Ambient Light Blog reviewed the song positively, calling it "[the] perfect single piece of team mastery, combin[ing] a sweet soulful sincerity that I like a lot."

Credits and personnel

A. Adams-Tamatea – bass
B. Kora – arrangement, drums, lyrics, producer, sampling, songwriting
S. Kora – synth
J. Shadbolt – vocals

Charts

Weekly charts

Year-end charts

Certifications

References

2018 singles
2017 songs
L.A.B. songs